Prionurus is a genus of surgeonfishes found mostly in the Pacific Ocean with one species, P. biafraensis, native to the Atlantic Ocean.

Species
There are currently seven recognized species in this genus:
 Prionurus biafraensis (Blache & Rossignol, 1961) - Biafra doctorfish
 Prionurus chrysurus J. E. Randall, 2001
 Prionurus laticlavius (Valenciennes, 1846) - razor surgeonfish
 Prionurus maculatus J. D. Ogilby, 1887 - yellowspotted sawtail
 Prionurus microlepidotus Lacépède, 1804 - sixplate sawtail
 Prionurus punctatus T. N. Gill, 1862 - yellowtail surgeonfish
 Prionurus scalprum Valenciennes, 1835 - scalpel sawtail

References

 
Acanthuridae
Marine fish genera
Taxa named by Bernard Germain de Lacépède